Spatulignatha olaxana is a moth in the family Lecithoceridae. It is found in Taiwan and the provinces of Zhejiang, Jiangxi and Fujian in China.

The wingspan is 17–18 mm. The species is characterized by the blackish antenna, the dark brown costa of the forewing and dark brown fascia.

References

Moths described in 1994
Spatulignatha